Crioprosopus thoracicus is a species of long-horned beetle in the family Cerambycidae. It was described by Henry Walter Bates in 1892.

References

Further reading

 

Trachyderini